List of Hunter × Hunter episodes may refer to:
Hunter × Hunter (1999 TV series)
Hunter × Hunter (2011 TV series)
List of Hunter × Hunter OVA episodes